Dennis Cronin (born 30 October 1967) is an English former professional footballer.

Player
Born in Altrincham, Cronin signed a professional contract with Manchester United on his 17th birthday. He was part of the FA Youth Cup team that played Manchester City in the 1986 FA Youth Cup Final.

In the summer of 1987, Cronin was released by Manchester United and joined Stockport County where he was to spend the next season. He made 15 league appearances and transferred to Crewe Alexandra the following summer before moving to non-league Northwich Victoria.

References

1967 births
Living people
English footballers
Manchester United F.C. players
Stockport County F.C. players
Crewe Alexandra F.C. players
English Football League players
Association football forwards